The 2018 German Darts Masters was the second staging of the tournament by the Professional Darts Corporation, and was the first entry in the 2018 World Series of Darts. The tournament featured 16 players (eight PDC players facing eight regional qualifiers) and was held at the Veltins-Arena in Gelsenkirchen, Germany on 25 May 2018.

Peter Wright was the defending champion after defeating Phil Taylor 11–4 in the final of the 2017 event, but he lost 8–2 in the semi-finals to Mensur Suljović.

Suljović won his first World Series title by defeating Dimitri Van den Bergh 8–2 in the final.

The event also broke the attendance record for a darts tournament with 20,210 people attending the event, beating the previous record set 70 years earlier.

Prize money
The total prize fund was £60,000.

Qualifiers

The eight invited PDC representatives were:

  Michael van Gerwen (quarter-finals)
  Peter Wright (semi-finals)
  Rob Cross (quarter-finals)
  Gary Anderson (semi-finals)
  Mensur Suljović (champion)
  Raymond van Barneveld (quarter-finals)
  Jamie Lewis (quarter-finals)
  Dimitri Van den Bergh (runner-up)

The German qualifiers were:

Draw

References 

German Darts Masters
German Darts Masters
World Series of Darts
Sport in Gelsenkirchen
May 2018 sports events in Germany